Leptogryllus is a genus of Hawaiian crickets. Species include:

References

 
Ensifera genera
Insects of Hawaii
Taxonomy articles created by Polbot